Envestnet, Inc. is an American financial technology corporation which develops and distributes wealth management technology and products to financial advisors and institutions. Their flagship product is an advisory platform that integrates the services and software used by financial advisors in wealth management.

Envestnet received controversy in 2020 when it was sued in a class action for its collection of consumer financial data. The company filed a motion to dismiss in November of 2020, which was partially granted but partially denied by the court.

History 
Envestnet was founded by Jud Bergman in 1999, with Bill Crager as co-founder. The company's initial public offering of stock filed on the NYSE and went public on 28 July 2010. It priced at $9; at the bottom of the range of $9–$10.  The major underwriters were Morgan Stanley, UBS AG, and Barclays. The company raised $63M by selling 7 million shares.

In 2012, Envestnet purchased Tamarac for $54 million.

In August 2015, Envestnet acquired Yodlee, a cloud-based data analytics company that provides account aggregation and various financial software, for $660 million. In the same year, Envestnet also acquired online investment platform Upside in February and financial-planning software provider Finance Logix in May. Envestnet stated that their main goal was to drive the acquisitions to provide a full suite of technology offerings for financial advisers.

In November 2017, the company introduced a redesigned Tamarac platform.

Bergman and his wife, 57-year-old Mary Miller, were killed on October 3, 2019, when a 34-year-old woman crashed her Volkswagen into the taxi they were riding on Highway 101 in San Francisco, California. The woman, 34-year-old Emilie Ross, and the taxi driver, 42-year-old Berkant Ramadan Ahmed, were also killed in the crash. Ross was allegedly under the influence of alcohol and driving on the wrong side of the highway. Crager took over as interim chief executive officer.

In December 2019, Envestnet entered an agreement with JPMorgan Chase to protect Chase's customers' financial data through an API.

In March 2020, Crager was named permanent CEO after serving as the interim CEO since October 2019.

Envestnet and Yodlee was sued in August of 2020 for collecting users' data without customer knowledge. The plaintiff, Deborah Wesch of New Jersey, accuses Yodlee and Envestnet of failing to "adequately protecting consumer data and have failed to put in place sufficient security protocols in the United States". Envestnet filed a motion to dismiss the lawsuit and successfully rid four of the ten claims, the remainder of which were not dismissed. Judge Sallie Kim of the United States District Court for the Northern District of California also ruled that the plaintiffs' alter ego claim lacked sufficient evidence to be justified; nevertheless, Judge Kim allowed the six remaining claims to be heard.

References

External links

Companies based in Chicago
Online financial services companies of the United States
Financial services companies established in 1999
2010 initial public offerings
Companies listed on the New York Stock Exchange
Financial technology companies
1999 establishments in Illinois